Kalon Ryshun Beverly (born February 12, 1997) is an American football defensive back who is currently a free agent. He played college football for the UTEP Miners football and most recently for the Cologne Centurions in the European League of Football.

Early life and college career
From 2012 to 2014 Beverly attended Edna Karr High School in his hometown, where he began playing as a safety for the varsity football team and was a member of the track team. In his senior year he switched to defensive back and recorded 26 tackles, six pass breakups and two interceptions in 12 gamekals played.

Beverly committed to the UTEP Miners football program in the NCAA Division I Football Bowl Subdivision, where he played in all four seasons. In his junior year he earned All-Conference USA Honorable Mention.

College statistics

Professional career

After going undrafted in the 2019 NFL draft, the Buffalo Bills invited him to their rookie minicamp, but wasn't signed. He than was signed by the Ottawa RedBlacks where he was on the roster for the entire year without collecting any statistics.

European League of Football
On March 9, 2022, the Cologne Centurions of the European League of Football signed Beverly for the last A-import spot of the 2022 season. There he reunites with Centurions head coach Frank Roser who was himself coach with the UTEP Miners.

Professional statistics

Private life
Beverly has two brothers and majored in digital media production.

References

External links
 UTEP Miners bio
 CFL bio
 ESPN bio

1997 births
Living people
American football quarterbacks
Players of American football from New Orleans
Ottawa Redblacks players
Cologne Centurions (ELF) players
American expatriate players of American football
American expatriate sportspeople in Germany